Omid (meaning "Hope") was Iran's first domestically made satellite. Omid was a data-processing satellite for research and telecommunications; Iran's state television reported that it was successfully launched on 2 February 2009. After being launched by an Iranian-made carrier rocket, Safir 1, the satellite was placed into a low Earth orbit. President Mahmoud Ahmadinejad supervised the launch, which coincided with the 30th anniversary of the Iranian Revolution; NASA verified the launch's success the following day. Its Satellite Catalog Number or USSPACECOM object number is 33506.

Ahmadinejad said the satellite was launched to spread "monotheism, peace and justice" in the world. The Tehran Times reported that "Iran has said it wants to put its own satellites into orbit to monitor natural disasters in the earthquake-prone nation and improve its telecommunications." Foreign minister Manouchehr Mottaki said that Iran launched the satellite to "meet the needs of the country" and that it was "purely for peaceful purposes". Since there was very little encryption on the satellite, data could be collected and read by citizens.

Sources in the Iranian Space Agency say the satellite's sole payload was a store and forward telecommunication capability.

The launch of Omid makes Iran the ninth country to develop an indigenous satellite launch capability.

Specifications
 Store and Forward Telecommunication Satellite
 Dimensions: 40 cm × 40 cm × 40 cm
 Weight: 27 kg
 Thermal Control: Passive
 Frequency Band: UHF
 Nodal Period: 90.7 minutes
 Inclination: 55.71°
 Apogee: 381.2 km
 Perigee: 245.5 km

Previous Iranian satellites
Omid was the second Iranian satellite to be placed into orbit. A previous Iranian satellite, Sina-1, was built and launched for Iran by Russia in 2005.

Test launch
Speaking at the opening of a new space centre on 4 February 2008, President Ahmadinejad announced that Omid would be launched in "the near future". On 17 August 2008, Iranian officials reported that they performed a test of the satellite carrier; they broadcast footage of the Safir rocket launch in darkness.

According to an American official, "The vehicle failed shortly after liftoff and in no way reached its intended position."

Orbit

The satellite was launched southeast over the Indian Ocean to avoid overflying neighboring countries and was placed into an orbit with an inclination of 55.5 degrees,
with a perigee of 246 km, an apogee of 377 km, and a period of 90.76 minutes.

End of mission
Omid was reported to have completed its mission without any problems. It completed more than 700 orbits over seven weeks. According to U.S. Strategic Command, the Omid satellite  re-entered Earth's atmosphere on 25 April 2009, during an 8-hour window centered on 0342 UT. The most likely re-entry location was over the south Atlantic Ocean, east of Buenos Aires, Argentina. No sightings were reported. The rocket body from the launch, which had also entered orbit, re-entered the atmosphere 31 May 2009.

Further launches
Iran launched Rasad 1 on 15 June 2011, orbiting for three weeks.

See also

Iranian Space Agency
List of orbits
Safir (rocket)
Sina-1
Khayyam satellite
Timeline of first orbital launches by country

References

External links
 Official Website
 Radio observations and other details of the Omid Mission
 Video of Iran's first domestic satellite launch
 pictures of the opening of Iran's first space system at mehrnews.com
 Real Time OMID Satellite Tracking

2009 in Iran
Satellites of Iran
Spacecraft launched in 2009
Spacecraft which reentered in 2009